29th Reconnaissance Squadron may refer to:
 The 419th Flight Test Squadron, designated the 29th Reconnaissance Squadron (Heavy) from February 1942 to April 1942. 
 The 29th Reconnaissance Squadron (Fighter) active from April 1943 to August 1943. 
 The 29th Attack Squadron, designated the 29th Reconnaissance Squadron (Night Photographic) from January 1946 to July 1946.

See also
 The 29th Photographic Reconnaissance Squadron, a component of the 2d Photographic Reconnaissance Group
 The 29th Tactical Reconnaissance Squadron